The Pick of Billy Connolly is a Billy Connolly compilation album.

Track listing
The album contained the following tracks:

"C and W Super Song"
"In Appreciation (The Welly Boot March)"
"Scottish Highland National Dress"
"Welly Boot Song"
"When in Rome"
"Sexie Sadie and Lovely Raquel"
"Ivan the Terrible"
"D.I.V.O.R.C.E."
"Football Violence"
"Tell Laura I Love Her"
"Marvo & the Lovely Doreen"

Charts

References

1981 live albums
Billy Connolly albums
Stand-up comedy albums